Dmytrivka is a popular name for populated places in Ukraine and can refer to:

Urban-type settlements
Dmytrivka, Chernihiv Oblast, an urban-type settlement in Chernihiv Oblast

Villages
Dmytrivka, Shakhtarsk Raion, a village in Donetsk Oblast
Dmytrivka, Volnovakha Raion, a village in Donetsk Oblast
Dmytrivka, Slovyansk Raion, a village in Donetsk Oblast
, a village in Kharkiv Oblast
Dmytrivka, Bolhrad Raion, Odesa Oblast, a village in Odessa Oblast
Dmytrivka, Kiliya Raion, a village in Odessa Oblast
Dmytrivka, Lyman Raion, a village in Odessa Oblast

See also 

 Dmitriyevka, the Russian equivalent